Epinephelus longispinis, also called the longspine grouper or the streaky spot grouper is a species of marine ray-finned fish from the Epinephelus genus.

According to the World Register of Marine Species E. longispinis' diet consists primarily of crustaceans, "especially crabs and stomatopods." The species' range is primarily in the Indian and Western Pacific Oceans.

References 

 
 
 
 

longispinis